Villar de Cobeta is a hamlet located in the municipality of Zaorejas, in Guadalajara province, Castilla–La Mancha, Spain. As of 2020, it has a population of 15.

Geography 
Villar de Cobeta is located 127km east-northeast of Guadalajara, Spain.

References

Populated places in the Province of Guadalajara